Mesha Mainor (born May 17, 1975), is an American politician from Georgia. Mesha Mainor is a Democrat member of the Georgia House of Representatives for District 56. She was born in Atlanta, Georgia and graduated from Benjamin E. Mays High School. She began her political career in Washington, D.C. working with Congressman John Lewis.  She received a master's degree in physical therapy at Howard University in 1999. While residing in Washington, D.C., she worked at the U..S. Agency for International Development under the leadership of Dr. Jacob Gayle in the Global Health division.

In 2000, she began working at the Centers for Disease Control and Prevention in Atlanta. She was a speechwriter and research analyst for the Assistant U.S Surgeon General, Dr. Helene Gayle. In this role, she was responsible for foreign and domestic public health presentations, legislative testimonies, film and radio productions, and co-authored journal articles.

In Atlanta she has served the physical therapy community in leadership positions at Emory Healthcare and Children’s Hospital of Atlanta. She also founded and trademarked the Junior Business League, a program to teach children entrepreneurship and advocacy.

As Georgia State Representative for District 56, her constituent voices are heard in Midtown Atlanta, Ansley Park, Castleberry Hill, English Avenue, Atlantic Station, Hunter Hills, Vine City, Dixie Hills, Mozley Park, Sherwood Forest, West Midtown, West End, and the last residing neighborhood of Dr. Martin Luther King Jr. before he died, in the Sunset Avenue Historical District.

Mesha Mainor is currently a doctoral student in business administration studying at Northcentral University. Her dissertation work focuses on ethics, diversity and inclusion, crisis preparedness, transformational leadership, disruptive innovation, and corporate sustainability.

After finishing one year in a Doctor of Philosophy in Human Services degree program at Capella University, she changed her degree plan to focus on strategy, leadership, and implementation theories in public and private  stakeholder asset management. She has two daughters that attend Atlanta Public Schools in Fulton County. She is an active member of a baptist church in her community.

Her campaign slogan is "The People's Voice", and she promises laws and advocacy that support her "SHE Campaign." SHE stands for safety, health, and 4 E's (education, economics, environment, equality).

In particular, she is a strong advocate for all crimes under the umbrella of family violence after becoming a victim of aggravated stalking when she began her first campaign for an elected office. She has been tied to the criminal justice system fighting for Victim Rights since 2019. Family violence laws include stalking, domestic violence, human trafficking, child abuse, rape, and dating violence.

State Representative Mesha Mainor served her first legislative term during the 2021-2022 sessions. The 2021-2022 session was one of the most contentious sessions for Georgia and America. Elected leaders voted on election reform, redistricting, constitutional carry, school choice, gang crimes, COVID-19, critical race theory, and the defund the police movement.

Rep. Mainor is a member of the Georgia General Assembly Governmental Affairs, Education, and State Planning & Community Affairs committees. She was nominated to attend the 2021-2022 Georgia Legislative Leadership Institute at the University of Georgia; appointed Vice-Chair of a Georgia Local Redistricting and Elections subcommittee; created the Fulton Technology and Energy Enhancement Authority to decrease energy burden in marginalized communities and increase the workforce development opportunities in technology and renewable energy. Rep. Mainor also passed H.R.798 which creates the House Study Committee on Cannabis Waste. The study committee will research and develop legislation on the benefits of using discarded portions of the cannabis and hemp plants. Particularly, Rep. Mainor is most interested in the production of biofuel from cannabis waste.

When asked what she is most proud of during her first term, she replied, "Serving my constituents and rising above the pressures to vote for laws that have a negative impact on my community. House Bill 1331 was controversial for political reasons, but it transferred $63 million dollars from the Georgia Department of Labor to the Technical College System of Georgia." Rep. Mainor is proud to differentiate herself from status-quo politicians that are concerned about re-elections instead of their constituency. As a result of her steadfastness and ability to work across the aisle to improve the communities she represents, she was re-elected for her second term (2023-2024) with nearly 70% of the votes in a three-person race without a run-off. "The people spoke, I am the People's Voice, and I will continue to vote based on what my community needs."

Representative Mainor published her first-year legislative highlights, including her controversial votes as a Democrat. "Voting across party lines is isolating in a highly politicized society, but, if voting against my party is best for my community I'd do it again," according to Representative Mainor. Many of her Democrat colleagues campaigned against her due to her commitment to people over party. The 2021-2022 controversial bills that made headlines include her support for the GA Special Needs Scholarship for children with disabilities; anti-defund the police legislation; increasing funding and infrastructure support for Georgia's Workforce Innovation and Opportunities Act programs; and drawing the Fulton County Board of Commissioners' redistricting map after the Board and others failed to present a map to the State Reapportionment office by the deadline to ensure the County could operate its 2022 May primary elections.

References

External links
www.MeshaMainor.com Campaign webpage

African-American state legislators in Georgia (U.S. state)
Democratic Party members of the Georgia House of Representatives
21st-century American politicians
Living people
21st-century American women politicians
Women state legislators in Georgia (U.S. state)
1975 births
21st-century African-American women
21st-century African-American politicians
20th-century African-American people
20th-century African-American women